Iz*One was a twelve-member South Korean and Japanese girl group formed in 2018 through Produce 48, a music competition reality show. The group achieved significant commercial success with its debut extended play Color*Iz (2018), released under Off the Record Entertainment, and won several new artist awards, including Best New Artist at the 20th Mnet Asian Music Awards, Rookie of the Year at the 33rd Golden Disc Awards, and the New Artist Award at the 28th Seoul Music Awards. The group's second EP, Heart*Iz (2019), was released to greater commercial success than its predecessor, and received Disc Bonsang nominations at the 34th Golden Disc Awards and the 29th Seoul Music Awards respectively. The EP's lead single, "Violeta", received a nomination for Song of the Year at the 21st Mnet Asian Music Awards.

The group earned its first ever daesang award nominations for its first studio album Bloom*Iz, released in February 2020. The album was nominated for Album of the Year at both the 12th Melon Music Awards and the 10th Gaon Chart Music Awards, while its lead single "Fiesta" was also nominated at both ceremonies for Best Dance – Female and Song of the Year – February respectively. Iz*One did not win any of the nominations but the group received its second Artist of the Year bonsang at the Melon Music Awards. Bloom*Iz garnered an additional Bonsang Award nomination at the 30th Seoul Music Awards. The group's follow-up EP, Oneiric Diary, released in June 2020, was also nominated alongside its predecessor at the Gaon Awards, for Album of the Year – 3rd Quarter. The group won its third Artist of the Year bonsang at the 3rd Fact Music Awards in December 2020.

Awards and nominations

Notes

References 

Iz*One
Awards